Aeroflot Flight 8641 was a Yakovlev Yak-42 airliner on a domestic scheduled passenger flight from Leningrad to Kiev (now Kyiv). On 28 June 1982, the flight crashed south of Mozyr, Belorussian SSR, killing all 132 people on board. The accident was both the first and deadliest crash of a Yakovlev Yak-42, and remains the deadliest aviation accident in Belarus.

The cause was a failure of the jackscrew controlling the horizontal stabilizer due to a design flaw.

Aircraft and crew 
The Yakovlev Yak-42 involved in the accident was registered to Aeroflot as CCCP-42529 (manufacturer number 11040104, series number 04-01). The aircraft made its maiden flight on 21 April 1981 and was delivered to Ministry of Civil Aviation on 1 June 1981. At the time of the accident, it had 795 flight hours and 496 takeoff and landing cycles.

All 124 passenger seats were filled, 11 by children. The cockpit crew consisted of:
 Captain Vyacheslav Nikolaevich Musinsky
 Co-pilot Alexandr Sergeevich Stigarev
 Navigator-trainee Viktor Ivanovich Kedrov
 Flight engineer Nikolai Semenovich Vinogradov

Sequence of events 
The aircraft took off from Pulkovo Airport at 9:01 Moscow time, having been delayed one minute because of a late passenger. At 10:45 it entered the zone of Kiev/Boryspil air traffic control Center. The crew started the landing checklist at 10:48:01. At 10:48:58 the crew informed the air traffic controller they reached the planned top of descent point, the controller clearing them for descent to FL255 (approximately ). The crew confirmed the flight path; no further communications were heard from Flight 8641.

At 10:51:20 the autopilot gradually brought about a horizontal stabilizer angle of up 0.3° for descent for landing. At 10:51:30 the stabilizer angle sharply increased, exceeding the 2° limit within half a second. The sudden change resulted in a negative g-force of -1.5 g, but the autopilot adjusted the controls to lower it to -0.6 g. As the stabilizer did not respond to commands and the plane went on diving, the autopilot switched off after 3 seconds. The pilots pulled back on the yoke trying to level out the plane, but it continued into a steep dive; soon it rolled 35° left and the dive achieved 50°.

All 132 people on board perished.

Cause 
The cause was determined to be a failure of the jackscrew mechanism in the aircraft's tail due to metal fatigue, which resulted from flaws in the Yak-42's design. The investigation concluded that among the causes of the crash were poor maintenance, as well as the control system of the stabilizer not meeting basic aviation standards. Three engineers who signed the jackscrew drawings were convicted.

As for the official cause of the crash: "the spontaneous movement of the stabilizer was due to disconnection in flight of the jackscrew assembly due to the almost complete deterioration of the 42M5180-42 thread-nuts due to structural imperfections in the mechanism." Due to the accident, all Yak-42s were withdrawn from service until the design defect was rectified in October 1984.

See also

 Alaska Airlines Flight 261 – a MD-83 accident in 2000 also resulting from a jackscrew failure
 American Airlines Flight 96 and Turkish Airlines Flight 981 - similar accidents involving in-flight structural failure due to design flaws, in which the latter contributed to the respective type grounding

References

1982 in Belarus
Aviation accidents and incidents in 1982
Aviation accidents and incidents in Belarus
Airliner accidents and incidents caused by mechanical failure
Airliner accidents and incidents caused by design or manufacturing errors
Airliner accidents and incidents caused by in-flight structural failure
Accidents and incidents involving the Yakovlev Yak-42
8641
Aviation accidents and incidents in the Soviet Union
June 1982 events in Europe
Aviation accidents and incidents caused by loss of control